Porth is a seaside hamlet in the civil parish of Newquay, Cornwall, United Kingdom. 

Porth is near the village of St Columb Minor. It was known as St. Columb Porth, Originally a small port for the village and was known for importing coal, salt, lime and a multitude of general cargoes. The village is to the east of a  sandy inlet with the Iron Age promontory fort of Trevelgue Head, on the northern side.

History 
Porth's full name is St Columb Porth (meaning the 'port of St Columb') and it was formerly in the civil parish of St Columb Minor. It has now been incorporated into Newquay civil parish but the ecclesiastical parish of St Columb Minor still exists.

St. Columb Porth was a small port and farm settlement before Newquay existed.

The long sheltered bay is a drowned river mouth and in the 19th century the tide reached Rialton almost two miles (3 km) inland.  This was the port for the village of St. Columb Minor. All the requirements of the village such as coal, salt, lime and a multitude of general cargoes were unloaded here. Grain and later china clay and stone were taken away from the port. When Newquay became a china clay port vessels discharged coal into carts on the beach at Porth and continued to Newquay to load china clay. Cavern Cottage on Alexandra Road was built with stone rubble in the mid 19th century and is a listed building. The oldest remaining cottage at Porth is Gwenna, which was built in the early seventeenth century. The base of the walls is cob, which is a mixture of clay, stones and straw. The farmhouse was Morvah, which was built in about 1660. Behind Morvah are the stables, now used as cottages, and beyond them is Concord Cottage. This building was used to store salt and the nets of the Concord Pilchard Sein Fishing Company. The fish cellar was built in 1804 and closed in 1846. The ruins are behind the cottage. The fishing vessels were built along the top of the sea wall behind the cellar.

Before the bridge was built in 1902 to carry Alexandra Road, all traffic crossed the beach and forded the river to Watergate Road.

Porth Valley has been used intensively. Slate has been quarried from the valley side and tin worked from the valley gravels in the 1830s. The Morganna Mine was worked there in the middle of the nineteenth century and the adits can be seen by the steps to Whipsiderry Beach. Valley clays were made into bricks and many were used in the building of the Atlantic Hotel in 1892. The first inlet on the Headland near the bottom of Watergate Road was the site of a shipyard where two schooners were built in 1857/8 and two smacks and a schooner between 1875 and 1880.

Glendorgal
On the southern side is the Glendorgal Hotel, built in 1850 as a gentleman's residence. In 1878 it was the residence of Arthur Pendarves Vivian, the member of parliament for the constituency of West Cornwall, who carried out extensive alterations in that year. In 1882 it was bought by Sir Richard Trevithick Tangye, a Cornishman born in Illogan who became a mechanical engineer, and along with his brothers started an engineering firm in Birmingham. The house became the residence of the Tangye Baronetcy created on 10 July 1912 for the industrialist Harold Tangye, the son of Sir Richard. Three generations of the Tangye family lived in Glendorgal including Sir Richard's grandson Derek Tangye; the author of the Minack Chronicles, nineteen novels based on a smallholding

near Lamorna Cove in West Cornwall. In 1950 the house was opened as a hotel by Nigel Tangye, brother of Derek.

Porth Veor Manor 
Porth Veor Manor Hotel was originally designed by Cornish architect Silvanus Trevail and was built in 1879. Porth Veor manor was first owned by Mr. William Stephens.

Located overlooking the Porth beach, it eventually became Porth Veor Manor hotel was owned and run in the 1920s by author Charlotte Mary Matheson and her husband Stanley Threlkeld. A prominent woman farmer, Charlotte wrote several novels including The Generation Between, still available in print.

Notable residents
(Past or present) have included:
 Charlotte Mary Matheson, English novelist (1892 to 1937)
 James Morrison (singer)
 Sir , 2nd Baronet (1912–1969)
 Derek Tangye, author, grandson of Sir Richard
 Nigel Tangye, brother of Derek Tangye and husband of actress Ann Todd
 Sir Richard Tangye, engineer

See also

 Newquay
St Columb Major
 St Columb Minor

References

External links

Villages in Cornwall
Surfing locations in Cornwall
Seaside resorts in Cornwall
Newquay